The  is an electric multiple unit (EMU) train type operated by the private railway operator Seibu Railway on limited express services in the Tokyo area of Japan since 1993.

Operations
Branded as "NRA" or "New Red Arrow", the trains are used on Koedo services from Seibu-Shinjuku in Tokyo to Hon-Kawagoe and on Musashi and Chichibu services from Ikebukuro in Tokyo to Hannō and Seibu Chichibu Station.

Formation
As of 1 April 2012, the fleet consists of 12 7-car sets, formed as follows.

Cars 2, 5, and 6 each have one single-arm pantograph, except set 10112, which has pantographs on cars 2 and 5 only.

History
The first two trains delivered were introduced in December 1993 on Koedo services from Seibu-Shinjuku in Tokyo to Hon-Kawagoe, replacing the former 5000 series Red Arrow trains.

A further three trainsets were delivered in 1994 and introduced on Chichibu services from Ikebukuro in Tokyo to Seibu-Chichibu on 15 October 1994.

The trains were refurbished internally between 2003 and 2008, and the old seats were re-used in Chichibu Railway 6000 series and Izukyu 8000 series trainsets.

On 13 March 2020, the 10000 series trainsets were withdrawn from Ikebukuro Line and Chichibu Line limited express services, being replaced by 001 series Laview trainsets. Since then, the fleet of 10000 series has been used on limited express service on the Seibu Shinjuku Line. 

Three cars were transferred to the Toyama Chihō Railway in October 2020. After spending 2021 undergoing preparation, they entered service on 19 February 2022.

Interior
The sets are monoclass with 2+2 abreast reclining seating.

Livery variations

Notes

References

External links

 Seibu 10000 series "New Red Arrow" 

Electric multiple units of Japan
10000 series
Train-related introductions in 1993
Hitachi multiple units
1500 V DC multiple units of Japan